Burwell Clark Ritter (January 6, 1810 – October 1, 1880) was a U.S. Representative from Kentucky, uncle of Walter Evans.

Born near Russellville, Kentucky, Ritter received a limited schooling.  He served as member of the Kentucky House of Representatives in 1842 and 1850.

Ritter was elected as a Democrat to the Thirty-ninth Congress (March 4, 1865 – March 3, 1867).  He was not a candidate for renomination in 1866.  He engaged in agricultural pursuits.  He died in Hopkinsville, Kentucky, October 1, 1880.  He was interred in Hopewell (later known as Riverside) Cemetery.

References

1810 births
1880 deaths
Democratic Party members of the Kentucky House of Representatives
People from Russellville, Kentucky
Democratic Party members of the United States House of Representatives from Kentucky
19th-century American politicians